John Salmon Hibbert (born 1869) was an English professional footballer who played as an outside forward. Born in Darwen, Lancashire, he was playing local junior football when he was signed by Football League side Burnley in May 1888. He played his only League match for Burnley on 27 October 1888 at Trent Bridge, Nottingham, then home of Notts County. Hibbert played outside-right in place of Alec Brady who had moved to inside-right. Despite kicking into the wind County were 2 up in eleven minutes. Later in the first-half County thought they had gone three up but their "goal" was ruled off-side. The second-half started hopefully for Burnley. The County goalkeeper Jack Holland was injured and Burnley winger Jack Yates made it 1–2. However ten minutes into the half County had re-established their two-goal lead. Burnley slumped as the match wore on and lost 1–6. 
Hibbert left Burnley in 1889, and his whereabouts thereafter are untraced.

References

1869 births
Year of death missing
People from Darwen
English footballers
Association football forwards
Burnley F.C. players
English Football League players
Association football midfielders